The Joint Senate of the Federal Supreme Courts of Justice (Gemeinsamer Senat der Obersten Gerichtshöfe des Bundes, also called the Common Senate) is often regarded as one of the supreme courts of justice in Germany, but it is rather, as its name suggests, an ad hoc judicial body that is convened only in specific cases. The Joint Senate consists of the Presidents of the five Federal Supreme Courts (excluding the Federal Constitutional Court) and two members of each of the Senates involved ("Senate" here denotes a judicial 'sub-unit' within a court, usually consisting of three or more judges, with all Federal Supreme Courts and subordinate courts of appeal being divided into several senates). The Joint Senate decides on questions regarding the interpretation of law that are relevant for all five branches of law overseen by the five Federal Supreme Courts.

The Joint Senate gathers rarely (between 2000 and 2010, there were only three decisions), as the areas of responsibility of the branches of justice in Germany are in general well-defined and so most of its rulings are on definitory matters. Its meetings are organised by the Federal Court of Justice in Karlsruhe. 

The Joint Senate should not be confused with the Great Senate that exists within each Federal Supreme Court. Its function is similar to that of the Joint Senate, as it mediates between the several Senates of a Supreme Court in cases of dissent. To make things even more confusing, the Federal Court of Justice has not one Great Senate but three: one for civil law issues, one for criminal law issues and one for disputes between the criminal law senates and the civil law senates. Also, the Federal Constitutional Court has a similar body, then called the Plenum, which consists of all the judges of the court and again meets only if a dispute arises between two different Senates that cannot be resolved otherwise. That case has occurred only five times, most recently in 2012.

External links
Official homepage (in German)
"Gesetz zur Wahrung der Einheitlichkeit der Rechtsprechung der obersten Gerichtshöfe des Bundes" – federal law defining the responsibilities of the Common Senate (in German)

Germany
Judiciary of Germany